Inodrillia dalli is a species of sea snail, a marine gastropod mollusk in the family Horaiclavidae.

It was previously included within the family Drilliidae and then in Turridae.

Description
The length of the shell varies between 15 mm and 27 mm.

This species, recognizable by its large blunt tip and brownish livid streaks or tint, is notably variable. The ribs much stronger than in the typical form, and closer set ; they even undulate the fasciole a little.

Distribution
This marine species occurs from New Jersey to Florida, US.

References

 Verrill, Trans. Conn. Acad., V. p. 451, pl. 57

External links
 Rosenberg G., Moretzsohn F. & García E. F. (2009). Gastropoda (Mollusca) of the Gulf of Mexico, Pp. 579–699 in Felder, D.L. and D.K. Camp (eds.), Gulf of Mexico–Origins, Waters, and Biota. Biodiversity. Texas A&M Press, College Station, Texas
  Tucker, J.K. 2004 Catalog of recent and fossil turrids (Mollusca: Gastropoda). Zootaxa 682:1–1295.
 

dalli